Imma psithyristis is a moth in the family Immidae. It was described by Edward Meyrick in 1906. It is found on the Solomon Islands.

The wingspan is 23–24 mm. The forewings are rather dark purplish-fuscous, strewn throughout with fine pale ochreous-fuscous strigulae and with a dark fuscous discal dot at three-fifths. The hindwings are rather dark fuscous.

References

Moths described in 1906
Immidae
Taxa named by Edward Meyrick
Moths of the Solomon islands